Hideko (written: , ,  or ) is a feminine Japanese given name. Notable people with the name include:

, Japanese writer
, Japanese table tennis player
, Japanese swimmer
, Japanese swimmer
, Japanese manga artist
, Japanese fencer
, Japanese cross-country skier
Hideko Takahashi, Japanese illustrator
, Japanese actress
Hideko Udagawa, Japanese classical violinist
, Japanese actress

Japanese feminine given names